The "7th" annual (void) Venice International Film Festival was held from 8 August to 1 September 1939. This edition has been strongly influenced by the Fascist regime and was deserted by the United States of America. The Mussolini Cup was won by the historical film Cardinal Messias, while the other main prizes were not awarded.

Jury
 Giuseppe Volpi di Misurata (Head of Jury)
 Olaf Andersson
 Luigi Bonelli
 Ottavio Croze
 Antonio de Obregón
 Dino Falconi
 F.T. Geldenhuys
 Neville Kearney
 Ernest Leichtenstern
 Antonio Maraini
 Ugo Ojetti
 Vezio Orazi
 Giacomo Paulucci de'Calboli
 Junzo Sato
 D.I. Suchianu
 Zdenk Urban
 Louis Villani
 Carl Vincent

In Competition

Awards
Mussolini Cup
Best Film - Cardinal Messias (Goffredo Alessandrini)
Volpi Cup
Best Actor - 
Best Actress - 
Bronze Medal
Girls in Distress (Georg Wilhelm Pabst)

References

External links
 
Venice Film Festival 1939 Awards on IMDb

1939 film festivals
1939 in Italy
Venice Film Festival
Film
August 1939 events
September 1939 events